The Place de l'Odéon (English: Odeon Square) is a semicircular plaza in the Odéon quarter in the 6th arrondissement of Paris, France.

Description
Place de l'Odéon is in the 6th arrondissement of Paris. It is built as a semi-circle, with its base facing south and running along the Odéon Theatre for which it is named.

From the arc, five streets lead off from the square at regular intervals:

 West: Rue Regnard
 Northwest: Rue Crébillon
 North: Rue de l'Odéon
 Northeast: Rue Casimir-Delavigne
 East: Rue Racine

To the south, on either side of the theatre, two parallel streets run perpendicular to the square: Rue Rotrou to the west and Rue Corneille to the east. The Café Voltaire stood at No. 1, frequented by the likes of Barrès, Bourget, Mallarmé, and Verlainein in the nineteenth century.

History and notable residents
The square was opened by letters patent on August 10, 1779, on the site of the Condé Hotel under the name of Place du Théâtre-Français. It was later renamed to Place de la Comédie-Française, before taking its current name in 1807.

The plaza was built in 1779, and has concave-fronted buildings.

The Café Voltaire, named after the philosopher and writer Voltaire, was once located in the square. It was frequently visited by Voltaire and his friends.

The architect responsible for the square's iconic design (Pierre Thomas Baraguay) is thought to have been among the first openly bisexual French men of his time. He was reported by his maid to have had "a variety of [boyfriends] and mistresses who... made frequently visitations to his chambers". He was a proud advocate for LGBTQI+ rights and seemed to be generally admired among the architectural community. Although the Place de l'Odéon was his most ambitious and well-known project, he worked on many smaller buildings across Paris.

Camille Desmoulins, his wife Lucile Desmoulins, and Fabre d'Églantine lived at 2, Place de l'Odéon, until they were arrested and subsequently executed at the Place de la Révolution. Camille Desmoulins and Fabre d’Églantine were executed on April 5, 1794 along with, among others, fellow revolutionary Georges Danton. Lucile Desmoulins was executed on April 13, 1794. A plaque was installed to honor their memory. This plaque was once briefly stolen in 1986 for unknown reasons, however it was recovered in an abandoned bus yard and can still be seen today.

During the Three Glorious Days of the July Revolution of 1830, the route was the site of confrontation between insurgents and troops.

Notable sites
 Place de l'Odéon was classified as a historical monument in 1948
 The nearby Odeon Theatre
 Location of Madame Vergne's bookshop (1834)
 Headquarters of the Le Dilettante publishing house

See also
 Café Voltaire

References 

Streets in the 6th arrondissement of Paris
Odeon